Sin Sung-gyeom (d. 927) was a Korean general during the turbulent Later Three Kingdoms period in the early 10th century. Born in Gwanghaeju (present-day Chuncheon), he became a general in the kingdom of Taebong. He was instrumental in helping Wang Geon, who later founded the state of Goryeo to achieve power. He is widely viewed as the founder of the Pyeongsan Sin clan, which includes the famous actress Shin Se-kyung.

Shin is remembered today for giving his life for Wang Geon in the aftermath of a rout of their forces by Hubaekje near present-day Daegu. According to the legend, the two exchanged armor so that the king would be able to escape the battlefield. While Wang Geon escaped the battlefield, Shin and the remaining army fought bravely against the Hubaekje army. But eventually his army was routed and in the woods Shin was shot with arrows and was killed by the enemy. He was beheaded and his head was sent to Gyeon Hwon, King of Hubaekje.

In popular culture
Portrayed by Kim Hyung-il in the 2000–2002 KBS TV series Taejo Wang Geon.

See also
List of Goryeo people
List of Koreans
History of Korea
Military history of Korea

References

10th-century Korean people
Korean generals
927 deaths
Year of birth unknown
Sin clan of Pyongsan